Calallen High School is a public high school serving grades 9–12. The school is located in the Calallen Independent School District in northwest Corpus Christi, Texas, United States.

Background

Calallen's name comes from Calvin Joseph (Cal) Allen (1859–1922), a prominent early rancher. Allen owned a  cattle ranch on which the Calallen Independent School District is now located. Allen donated land to the St. Louis, Brownsville and Mexico Rail Line as right-of-way; in exchange, the railroad agreed to place a depot on Allen's property. Allen then subdivided the land adjacent to the depot and established a townsite there. The town was named Calvin until it was discovered that another community in Texas already had that name. Founded in 1910, Calallen was annexed by the city of Corpus Christi in 1970.

Notable alumni
 Amy Acuff, U.S. Olympian and Playboy Model
 John A. Brieden, former national commander of the American Legion
 Tom DeLay, former U.S. Congressman and House Majority Leader
 Jessie Pavelka, U.S. TV actor and model
 Dustin Vaughan, quarterback for the Baltimore Ravens
 Logan Verrett, baseball pitcher for the New York Mets
 Rob Zastryzny, baseball pitcher for the Chicago Cubs

References

External links
 

High schools in Corpus Christi, Texas
Public high schools in Texas
Schools in Nueces County, Texas
Education in Corpus Christi, Texas
1910 establishments in Texas